is an athletic stadium in Toshima, Tokyo, Japan.

It hosted the 1979 Empress's Cup and 1980 Empress's Cup.

External links
Official site

Sports venues in Tokyo
Football venues in Japan